Park Hotel may refer to:

Hotels

China 
 Park Hotel Shanghai, the tallest building in Asia until 1952

India 
 The Park Hotels, chain of Hotels

Norway 

 Scandic Park Hotel, chain hotel in Sandefjord, Norway

Singapore
 Park Hotel Group, chain of hotels

United Kingdom
 Park Hotel, Preston

United States 
Park Hotel (Columbus, Ohio)
Park Hotel (Hot Springs, Arkansas), listed on the NRHP in Arkansas
Park Hotel (Sac City, Iowa), listed on the NRHP in Iowa
Park Hotel (Seguin, Texas), listed on the NRHP in Texas
Park Hotel (Salt Lake City, Utah), listed on the NRHP in Utah
Park Hotel and Cabins, listed on the NRHP in Michigan
Astor House, New York, New York, a hotel previously known as the Park Hotel that was demolished in early 20th century

Other
 Park Hotel (album), a 1986  album by Italian singer-songwriter Alice
 Park Hotels & Resorts, a real estate investment trust

See also 
 The Park (disambiguation)
 Park Plaza Hotels & Resorts, a hotel chain once owned by Park Hotels International, LLC